The following is the performance of candidates from major alliances of the 2021

Kerala Legislative Assembly election, namely the candidates from the Left Democratic Front (LDF), United Democratic Front (UDF) and National Democratic Alliance (NDA).

References

State Assembly elections in Kerala
2020s in Kerala